Curtis Lynn Collier (born October 4, 1949) is a senior United States district judge of the United States District Court for the Eastern District of Tennessee.

Education and career
Born in Marianna, Arkansas, Collier received a Bachelor of Science degree from Tennessee State University in 1971 and a Juris Doctor from Duke University School of Law in 1974. He was in the United States Air Force from 1974 to 1979. While in the Air Force, he was an Assistant Staff Judge Advocate in the Judge Advocate General's Corps with the rank of Captain. He was an Assistant United States Attorney of the Eastern District of Louisiana from 1979 to 1987 and held the same office in the Eastern District of Tennessee from 1987 to 1995.

Federal judicial service

Collier is a United States district judge of the United States District Court for the Eastern District of Tennessee. He was nominated by President Bill Clinton on February 13, 1995, to a new seat created by 104 Stat. 5089. He was confirmed by the Senate on May 8, 1995, and received his commission on May 10, 1995. He served as chief judge from 2005 to 2012. He assumed senior status on October 31, 2014.

See also 
 List of African-American federal judges
 List of African-American jurists

References

External links 

He currently lives in Tennessee.

1949 births
Living people
African-American judges
Assistant United States Attorneys
Duke University School of Law alumni
Judges of the United States District Court for the Eastern District of Tennessee
People from Marianna, Arkansas
Tennessee State University alumni
United States Air Force officers
United States district court judges appointed by Bill Clinton
20th-century American judges
21st-century American judges
United States Air Force Judge Advocate General's Corps